The St Thomas More Roman Catholic Church, formerly Bradford-on-Avon Town Hall, is a place of worship in Market Street, Bradford-on-Avon, Wiltshire, England. The structure, which originally served as the local town hall, is a Grade II listed building.

History

An old market hall used to stand at the east end of the Shambles: it was arcaded on the ground floor, so that meat markets could be held, with an assembly hall on the first floor. Meetings of the court leet were held in the assembly room and the basement was used as a store. By the early 19th century the building had become dilapidated and it was demolished in 1826.

Following the election of town commissioners in the mid-19th century, one of their first actions was to procure a new town hall: the site they chose was at the corner of Market Street and Church Street. The new building was designed by Thomas Fuller in the Elizabethan style, built in Bath stone and was completed in 1854. The design featured a prominent four-stage tower at the corner the two streets: the first stage involved a doorway with an arched archivolt, the second stage featured a three-light window, the third stage involved a clock face with an ogee-shaped surround while the fourth stage featured an octagonal piece with lancet windows and grotesques. The whole structure was surmounted by an onion-shaped dome with a ball and weather vane. The Church Street wing, which accommodated a solicitor' s office, featured a prominent oriel window while the Market Street wing, which accommodated the local police station, featured entrances with stone plaques identifying the police station and the office of the police superintendent. Internally, the principal rooms in the complex, which were on the first floor, were the council chamber, the mechanics institute, the library and the reading room.

Following significant population growth, largely associated with the woolen industry, the area became an urban district in 1894. The new council used the town hall as its offices until it acquired Westbury House in 1911. Following a few years of use as a cinema, the town hall was acquired by Midland Bank in around 1915. Midland Bank converted the Church Street wing into a bank branch to service its customers and rented out the council chamber to the local branch of the Catholic Church.

In 1955, the Roman Catholic Diocese of Clifton acquired ownership of the building from Midland Bank which continued to occupy space in the Church Street wing but on a rental basis. The building was subsequently converted for use as a place of worship, dedicated to the lawyer, Sir Thomas More. The bank branch, which was rebranded following the acquisition of Midland Bank by HSBC in 1992, continued to occupy the Church Street wing while the Market Street wing was converted for retail use, to a design by Esmond Murray of Bath in 1994. As part of national programme of closures, HSBC vacated the Church Street wing in September 2013.

References

External links
  Official site

Government buildings completed in 1854
City and town halls in Wiltshire
Grade II listed buildings in Wiltshire
Roman Catholic churches in Wiltshire
Bradford On Avon, Saint Thomas More
Bradford-on-Avon